New Majority (Slovak: Nová väčšina, NOVA) is a conservative political party in Slovakia.

Naming history 
 : New Majority (NOVA)
 : New Majority (Daniel Lipšic) (NOVA)
 : New Majority – Agreement (D. Lipšic) (NOVA)
 From : NEW

History
The party was established on 2 September 2012 by Daniel Lipšic and Jana Žitňanská, representatives of Slovak national council, who had previously left the Christian Democratic Movement (KDH). Daniel Lipšic, who had also been the vice-president of his former party, was elected its president. They represent a conservative faction of party. In May 2013, five representatives of Freedom and Solidarity (SaS) , Juraj Droba, Daniel Krajcer, Juraj Miškov, and Martin Chren left the party, joining New Majority. They represent a liberal faction of the party.

In the 2014 European elections, New Majority came in fifth place nationally, receiving 6.83% of the vote and electing 1 MEP.

In the 2016 parliamentary elections NOVA ran its candidates on a common list with Ordinary People, getting two of them elected.

Election results

National Council

European Parliament

Notes

References

External links
Nova official website

 
European Conservatives and Reformists member parties
Conservative parties in Slovakia
Liberal conservative parties in Slovakia
Classical liberal parties
Christian democratic parties in Slovakia
Political parties established in 2012
Political parties disestablished in 2015
2012 establishments in Slovakia
Christian Democratic Movement breakaway groups